A turnbuckle, stretching screw or bottlescrew is a device for adjusting the tension or length of ropes, cables, tie rods, and other tensioning systems. It normally consists of two threaded eye bolts, one screwed into each end of a small metal frame, one with a left-hand thread and the other with a right-hand thread. The tension can be adjusted by rotating the frame, which causes both eye bolts to be screwed in or out simultaneously, without twisting the eye bolts or attached cables.

Uses
Turnbuckles are most commonly used in applications which require a great deal of tension; they can range in mass from about ten grams for thin cable used in a garden fence, to thousands of kilograms for structural elements in buildings and suspension bridges.

Aircraft
Turnbuckles have been used in aircraft construction, especially during the early years of aviation. Historically, biplanes might use turnbuckles to adjust the tension on structural wires bracing their wings. Turnbuckles are also widely used on flexible cables in flight control systems. In both cases they are secured with lockwire or specifically designed wire clips to prevent them from turning and losing tension due to vibration.

Shipping
Turnbuckles are used for tensioning a ship's rigging and lashings. This device is also known as a bottlescrew in this context.

Sports
Turnbuckles find common use to tension the ropes in professional wrestling rings and boxing rings, where they serve as the attachment between the ring ropes and ring posts. Rather than the usual bare metal, here the turnbuckles are covered with padding in order to protect participants and staff. Turnbuckles even play a part in professional wrestling where they are often dramatically used by participants as part of their offensive moveset.

Entertainment industry
Turnbuckles are used in nearly all rigging performed in the entertainment industry, including theatre, film, and live concert performances. In entertainment rigging, turnbuckles are more commonly used to make small adjustments in line lengths. This is generally to make a flown unit sit parallel to the stage. Another way a turnbuckle could prove helpful is with making very minor height or angle adjustments.

Pipe systems
Turnbuckles are used in piping systems as a way to provide minor adjustments for field inconsistencies. This also allows for a minimum amount of resistance when transferring the load to the support components.

Orthopaedics
A type of splint is used for upper limb to produce gradual stretching over contracted joint by its turn buckle mechanism. Used to treat stiff elbow and Volkmann Ischemic Contracture.

Gallery

See also
 Buffers and chain coupler
 Guy-wire
 Mechanical joint

References

External links
 

Hardware (mechanical)
Sailing rigs and rigging